In Māori mythology, Tangotango (sometimes called Hāpai) was a celestial woman who fell in love with the great hero Tāwhaki and came to earth to become his wife.  After bearing him a daughter, Arahuta, they quarreled and she returned to heaven.  Tāwhaki and his brother set out on a great adventure to find her.

References

Māori gods